Mount Jurupa is the highest point of the Jurupa Mountains, located in northwestern Riverside County, California. The summit is just south of the Riverside – San Bernardino county line. A hiking trail leads to its summit, which offers panoramic views of Riverside, Fontana, San Bernardino, and Moreno Valley.

In a small canyon at the base of the mountain is the Jurupa Mountains Discovery Center, a non-profit educational facility that includes nature trails, gardens, and an Earth Science Museum.

The name can be traced to the Jurupa land grant dated September 28, 1838. Before the secularization of the missions, Jurupa was the name of one of the Mission San Gabriel ranchos. Jarupa was probably a Serrano or Gabrielino Shoshonean name.

See also
List of Riverside County, California, placename etymologies#Jurupa

References

External links
 
 

Mountains of Riverside County, California
Mountains of Southern California